Murder off Miami is a 1987 whodunnit adventure video game based on the book of the same name by British thriller novelist Dennis Wheatley. Players take the role of Detective Officer Kettering, who is inspecting the supposed suicide of a British financier on a cruise ship in the waters near Miami. His job is to unravel the mystery.

Gameplay 

Players progress by collecting clues, interrogating people, and interacting with the environment. The interface is largely text-based, with occasional images to set the scene. Commands are given to complete actions. Gameplay is split into three parts which represent the three days of investigation.

Development 
The game was co-written by Fergus McNeill, who had previous authored The Hobbit and Lord of the Rings parody games The Boggit and Bored of the Rings. It is based on a novel of the same name by Dennis Wheatley; this text already had some interactivity through the use of physical clues provided with the book such as a blood-stained curtain and cigarette butts, plus an envelope at the end cover to reveal the answer.

There was a fatal bug in the first batch of Spectrum units, resulting in the game restarting each time the player tried to get out of their chair at the beginning of the game.

Reception 

Sinclair User thought the game would have used a packaging style similar to that of Weatley's novel. Meanwhile, ZX Computing's review was cut short due to the bug, but the reviewer was impressed with what they experienced and looked forward to reviewing it again the following month.

References

External links 
 

1980s interactive fiction
Interactive fiction based on works
1986 video games
Amstrad CPC games
Commodore 64 games
Video games about police officers
Video games developed in the United Kingdom
ZX Spectrum games
Video games set in Miami
CRL Group games